This is the incomplete list of official social and NGO organisations in Myanmar. You can expand it.
 Auxiliary Fire Brigade
 Biodiversity and Nature Conservation Association (BANCA)
 Foreign Correspondents' Club of Myanmar
 Forest Resource Environment Development and Conservation Association
 Manaung Township Association (Yangon)
 Myanmar Auxiliary Fire Brigade
 Myanmar Christian Fellowship of the Blind
 Myanmar Computer Federation
 Myanmar Computer Industry Association
 Myanmar Computer Professionals Association
 Myanmar Corn Farmers' Association (MCFA & EU)
 Myanmar Dental Association
 Myanmar Edile Oil Millers Association
 Myanmar Engineering Society
 Myanmar Floriculturists Association
 Myanmar Health Assistants Association
 Myanmar Heart Development Organization
 Myanmar Hiking and Mountaineering Association
 Myanmar Library Association
 Myanmar Maternal and Child Welfare Association
 Myanmar Medical Association
 Myanmar Motion Picture Asiayone
 Myanmar Motion Picture Organisation
 Myanmar Music Asiayone
 Myanmar Music Organisation
 Myanmar National Committee for Women's Affairs
 Myanmar Nurses Association
 Myanmar Overseas Seafarers Association
 Myanmar Pharmceutical Association (MPA)
 Myanmar Photographic Society
 Myanmar Printing and Publishing Association
 Myanmar Red Cross Society
 Myanmar Sports Writers Federation
 Myanmar Thabin Organisation
 Myanmar Theatrical Organisation
 Myanmar Traditional Artist and Artisans Organisation
 Myanmar Veterans' Organisation
 Myanmar War Veteran Organisation
 Myanmar Women's Affairs Federation
 Myanmar Women's Development Association
 Myanmar Women's Entrepreneurs Association
 Myanmar Writers and Journalists Association
 Myanmar Writers and Journalists Organisation
 The Central Committee for Drug Abuse Control
 Union of Myanmar Federation of Chambers of Commerce and Industry
 Union Solidarity and Development Association
 Myanmar Environmental Legal Services (MELS)
 Capacity Building Initiative (CBI)

External links to social and NGO organisations
 Union Solidarity and Development Association
 Myanmar Women's Affairs Federation 
 The Central Committee for Drug Abuse Control 
 Myanmar Computer Federation 
Myanmar Computer Professionals Association 
 Myanmar Computer Industry Association 
 Myanmar Overseas Seafarers Association 
 Union of Myanmar Federation of Chambers of Commerce and Industry 
 The Myanmar Maternal and Child Welfare Association 

NGO Myanmar